Alexander James Woodland (born 16 January 1998) is an English cricketer. He made his first-class debut on 1 April 2018 for Cardiff MCCU against Gloucestershire as part of the Marylebone Cricket Club University fixtures.

References

External links
 

1998 births
Living people
English cricketers
Cardiff MCCU cricketers
Buckinghamshire cricketers
People educated at St Edward's School, Oxford
Sportspeople from Windsor, Berkshire